The Kottonmouth Xperience is the Kottonmouth Kings' sixth official album released on November 16, 2004. It contains remixes of previous songs. The album includes a bonus DVD of the same name, The Kottonmouth Xperience.

Track listing

References 

Kottonmouth Kings albums
2004 albums
Suburban Noize Records albums